George Strez Balšić or Gjergj Balsha ( 1444–57) and his brothers Gojko and Ivan were the lords of Misia, a coastal area from the White Drin towards the Adriatic. The brothers were members of the Balšić noble family, which had earlier held Zeta. They participated in founding of the League of Lezhë, an alliance led by their maternal uncle Skanderbeg. George later betrayed Skanderbeg, by selling a domain to the Ottomans, while his two brothers continued to support Skanderbeg until his death and then continued to fight for the Venetian forces.

Family 

According to Fan S. Noli George and his brothers Ivan and Gojko were nephews of Skanderbeg from his sister Jelena who married Pavle Balšić. Genealogy of Kastrioti family written by Karl Hopf does not present the information about George Strez Balšić being a son of Skanderbeg's sister Jelena.

League of Lezhë 

The three Balšić brothers joined the League of Lezhë, an alliance formed by their maternal uncle Skanderbeg, after meeting in the St. Nicholas Church in Lezhë on March 2, 1444. The members included Lekë Zaharia, Peter Spani, Lekë Dushmani, Andrea Thopia, Gjergj Arianiti, Theodor Musachi, Stefan Crnojević, and their subjects.  Skanderbeg was elected its leader, and commander in chief of its armed forces numbering a total of 8,000 warriors.

In 1451 after Alfonso signed the Treaty of Gaeta with Skanderbeg, he signed similar treaties with George Strez Balšić and other chieftains from Albania:  Gjergj Arianiti, Gjin Muzaka, Peter Spani, Pal Dukagjini, Thopia Muzaka, Peter of Himara, Simon Zenebishi and Carlo II Tocco.

According to Albanian historians Kristo Frashëri and Fan Noli, Strez Balšić betrayed Skanderbeg by selling the fortress he controlled (Modritza) to the Ottoman Empire in spring 1457. Skanderbeg was betrayed by another of his nephews, Hamza Kastrioti, who deserted to the Ottomans.

Issue 

Karl Krumbacher believed that the first daughter of Maurice Spata married Giorgio, a son of "George Balšić and Eudokia".

Annotations

References

Sources

 
 
 

 

George Strez
15th-century rulers in Europe